Quetzal Guerrero is an American-born, Latin soul singer.

Biography

Early life and education
When he was four years old, Arizona native Quetzal Guerrero picked up the violin and has continued to play.

As a child and adolescent, Guerrero studied violin at the Academy of the Suzuki Method, in Matsumoto, Japan, and the Conservatorio Pernambucano de Musica in Recife, Brazil. Through the years, Guerrero's proficiency in violin, guitar, percussion, and vocals has allowed him to grow into one of the more prominent artists in the Latin Soul music scene. Guerrero is akin to such Grammy Award-winning musicians as Jamiroquai, Maxwell and Van Hunt, who all have distinct sounds

Collaborations
Guerrero's touring and performing has led to collaborations and performances with a long string of iconic musicians and performers, including Tito Puente, Lalo Guerrero, Cristian Castro, Acoustic Alchemy and Jorge Santana. Mr. Guerrero's talents have also garnered praise from world-renowned producers and DJs, including Osunlade, Rocky Dawuni, Grammy Award winner Vikter Duplaix and key influencer Garth Trinidad of 89.9 FM KCRW and KCRW.org.

Musical stylings
Guerrero's music, much like his American/Mexican/Brazilian heritage, bridges many Latin and American cultures and styles. The result is music that offers a convergence of styles and influences spanning American folk, soul, jazz, funk, samba, bossa nova, reggae, and Afrobeat. His sound is inspired by the likes of Sting, Sade, Santana and during his live performances, Guerrero mixes in 90's R&B and Neo-Soul covers by groups like Groove Theory and Wreckx-N-Effect, a multi-platinum New Jack Swing Hip-Hop group produced by Teddy Riley.

Album releases
Following the release of the critically acclaimed Vamos Conversar EP (2007) and Now (2009) through Yoruba Records, Guerrero's second album, Coiza Boa (Good Thing), released in the summer of 2011, is  his most recent work. The album is sung in English and Portuguese. Guerrero is also a dancer and capoeirista and is currently resident in Los Angeles, California.

Discography

Solo albums

References 

Living people
Year of birth missing (living people)
American soul singers